Parari may refer to:
 Parari, Buxar, a village in Buxar district, Bihar, India
 Parari, Paraíba, a municipality in Paraíba, Brazil
 Parari (film), a 2013 Indian Kannada-language film
 Parrari, or Parari, a terrorist outfit founded by Sher Mohammad Marri in 1962
 Muhsin Parari, Indian film director, writer and lyricist